Sir Arthur Herbert Dyke Acland, 13th Baronet, PC (13 October 18479 October 1926) was a Liberal politician and political author. He is best remembered for his involvement in education, serving as Vice-President of the Council of Education under William Ewart Gladstone and the Earl of Rosebery between 1892 and 1895.

Background and education
Acland was born at Holnicote, near Porlock, Somerset, the second son of Sir Thomas Dyke Acland, 11th Baronet, and Mary, daughter of Sir Charles Mordaunt, 8th Baronet. Sir Thomas Dyke Acland, 12th Baronet, was his elder brother. He was educated at Rugby School and Christ Church, Oxford, and was called to the Bar, Inner Temple, in 1867.

Early career
After graduation, Acland became a lecturer and tutor at Keble College, Oxford. He became a deacon in the Church of England in 1872 and a priest in 1874. He retired from holy orders in 1879 to pursue a political career. He served in various posts at colleges at Oxford from 1877 to 1885, most notably his administration, from 1878 onwards, of the Oxford Extension Lectures, which both furthered his grounding in the education field and brought him into contact with the industrial classes in the North of England, who would become his political base. In 1886, he served as President of the second day of the Co-operative Congress.

In 1879, Acland sat on the committee to create an Oxford women's college "in which no distinction will be made between students on the ground of their belonging to different religious denominations." This resulted in the founding of Somerville Hall (later Somerville College).

Parliamentary career
Though a wealthy aristocrat, Acland became the Liberal candidate for the industrial constituency of Rotherham. The incongruity was increased by the fact that the Yorkshire town was several hundred miles from Acland's home in Devon. Nonetheless, he was easily elected in 1885 and remained Member of Parliament for Rotherham until the end of his political career in 1899.

Acland became one of the principal sponsors of the 1889 Welsh Intermediate Education Act, making the County Councils in Wales responsible for education – a reform not introduced in England until 1902. In 1892, William Ewart Gladstone appointed Acland Vice-President of the Council of Education, with a seat in the cabinet. His cabinet status gave him effective control of the educational authorities (The Council President, Lord Kimberley, was a figurehead). He was sworn of the Privy Council at the same time.

Acland's principal legislative achievements were both enacted in 1893: The Elementary Education (Blind and Deaf Children) Act, and the Elementary Education (School Attendance) Act (which made education compulsory up to the age of eleven). The same year, he promulgated the Evening Continuation School Code, which laid the foundation for adult education, and issued Circular 321, which required inspectors to submit a report to the Education Department about the condition of buildings and apparatus in each public elementary school.

Acland's physical and mental health were not equal to the tasks he undertook, and his ill health continued after he left office after the Liberals' defeat in the General Election of 1895. Although re-elected, he effectively resigned from Parliament in 1899 by requesting appointment to the position of Steward of the Manor of Northstead, a nominal office of profit under the Crown.

Later life and other honours
After his retirement, Acland served on several government commissions. In 1908, he declined a peerage. He worked on revised editions of his Handbook in Outline of the Political History of England (co-authored with Cyril Ransome, father of children's author Arthur Ransome), a longtime standard in the field.

Family
Acland married Alice Sophia Cunningham, daughter of Reverend Francis Macaulay Cunningham, in 1873. In 1919, at the age of 71, he succeeded his brother as ninth Baronet of Columb-John of the 1644 creation and thirteenth Baronet of Columb-John of the 1678 creation. He died in October 1926, aged 78, and was succeeded in his titles by his eldest son, Francis. Lady Acland died in July 1935.

References

External links
 

1847 births
1926 deaths
Arthur Herbert Dyke
Alumni of Christ Church, Oxford
Baronets in the Baronetage of England
Fellows of Keble College, Oxford
Liberal Party (UK) MPs for English constituencies
People educated at Rugby School
People from West Somerset (district)
Presidents of Co-operative Congress
Presidents of the Liberal Party (UK)
UK MPs 1885–1886
UK MPs 1886–1892
UK MPs 1892–1895
UK MPs 1895–1900
Members of the Privy Council of the United Kingdom
People associated with Somerville College, Oxford
Founders of colleges of the University of Oxford